Mill Plain BRT is a future bus rapid transit (BRT) route in Vancouver, Washington, United States, that will be operated by C-Tran as part of The Vine. The  line, which will replace C-Tran Route 37, will run from Turtle Place in downtown Vancouver to a future transit center on 184th Avenue via Mill Plain Boulevard. Groundbreaking for the project took place on September 28, 2021, and service is projected to begin in 2023.

In 2021, the project received a $24.9 million grant from the Federal Transit Administration to help pay for the project, including the purchase of eight new buses.

The new line will feature offboard fare payment, and near-level boarding.

References

Bus rapid transit in Washington (state)
Transportation in Vancouver, Washington